Lara Arruabarrena and Lourdes Domínguez Lino won the first edition of the tournament, defeating Raluca Olaru and Valeria Solovyeva in the final, 6–4, 7–5.

Seeds

Draw

References 
 Main draw

BNP Paribas Katowice Open - Doubles
2013 Doubles